Teufenbach-Katsch is a municipality since 2015 in the Murau District of Styria, Austria.

It was created as part of the Styria municipal structural reform,
at the end of 2014, by merging the former towns Teufenbach and Frojach-Katsch.

Geography

Municipality arrangement 
The municipality territory includes the following three hamlets (populations as of January 2015):
 Frojach (572)
 Katsch an der Mur (593)
 Teufenbach (692)

The municipality consists of the three Katastralgemeinden: Frojach, Katsch und Teufenbach.

Culture and sights 
 Pfarrkirche Frojach church

References

External links 

Cities and towns in Murau District